Burton Melvin Cross (November 15, 1902 – October 22, 1998) was an American Republican businessman and politician.  Cross was Maine's 61st and 63rd Governor, though his two terms were separated by just 25 hours.

Biography
Born in Augusta, Maine on November 15, 1902, Cross graduated from Augusta's Cony High School in 1920, and became a florist in Augusta.

In 1933, Cross won a seat on the Augusta Common Council and in 1937 he was elected to the Board of Aldermen, and he served as presiding officer of both bodies.  He won a seat in the Maine House of Representatives in 1941, where he served two terms before winning election to the Maine Senate in 1945.  He became majority floor leader in 1947 and served as President of the Senate from 1949 to 1952.

In 1952, Cross won the Republican nomination for Governor and went on to defeat Democrat James Oliver in the general election by a substantial margin.  Cross actually became Governor about two weeks prior to the start of his elected term of office when Governor Frederick G. Payne resigned on December 25, 1952 to prepare for his upcoming term in the United States Senate; Cross, as President of the Senate became Governor through constitutional succession.  Cross' term as Senate President (and Governor) expired at 10:00am on January 7, 1953, allowing Senator Nathaniel M. Haskell as the newly elected president of the Senate to serve as governor for 25 hours.  At 11:00am on January 8, 1953, Cross' official elected term of office began

During Cross's term, the state highway commission was reorganized under a full time commissioner, and the state finance office was modernized and brought under closer control of the governor.  The state liquor commission was also restructured, following a controversy in which commissioners and employees were accused of accepting bribes from distributors in exchange for carrying certain brands at state-owned liquor stores.  Cross also caused dissension in Republican ranks with some of his appointments, including naming an attorney who was a political supporter to the superior court and then to the state supreme court, passing over judges then currently serving on lower courts, and appointing another supporter with minimal law enforcement experience to fill a vacant sheriff's position ahead of the candidate preferred by the party and the voters of the county.

Although personally exonerated in the liquor scandal, a politically wounded Cross was defeated in his reelection bid in 1954 by Democratic challenger, Edmund S. Muskie, by over 20,000 votes.  Cross never sought public office again but returned to private life as an insurance and stock broker until his retirement in 1971.

Death and burial
Cross died in Augusta on October 22, 1998;  he was buried at Forest Grove Cemetery in Augusta.

Family
Cross was married to Olena R. Moulton;  they were the parents of two children.

Legacy
In 2001, after major renovations, the Maine State Office Building was dedicated to Cross.  A plaque in his honor is located in the second floor lobby.

Notes

Sources

Internet

Newspapers

1902 births
1998 deaths
Republican Party members of the Maine House of Representatives
Presidents of the Maine Senate
Republican Party Maine state senators
Republican Party governors of Maine
People from Augusta, Maine
Maine city council members
Politicians from Augusta, Maine
20th-century American politicians